Zemplín is a village and municipality in Trebišov District of the Košice Region.

History
In historical records the village was first mentioned in 1214.

Geography
The village lies at an altitude of 106 metres and covers an area of 14,67 km². It is located near the junction point of the rivers Ondava and Latorica (tributaries of the river Bodrog) in eastern Slovakia.  Zemplín is also the location of Zemplín Castle, former administrative center of the former Zemplén County during the time the Kingdom of Hungary ruled the area.

Demographics
According to the 2001 census, 64.2% of inhabitants were Hungarians and 35.8% were Slovaks.

In 2019 the village had a population of 368.

References

Villages and municipalities in Trebišov District
Hungarian communities in Slovakia